Luca Ceriscioli (born 15 March 1966 in Pesaro) is an Italian politician. He is a former mayor of Pesaro and former President of the Marche region.

Biography
Graduated in mathematics from the University of Bologna, he was a Mathematics teacher at the Urbino Industrial Technical Institute.

In 1995 he was elected councilor in the IV district of the municipality of Pesaro for the Progressives list.

From 2000 to 2004 he was a municipal Assessor of Pesaro with the delegation of public works. In 2004 he was elected Mayor of Pesaro with the 56.1% of preferences; in 2009 he was re-confirmed with the 52.3% of preferences.

President (2015–2020)

In the 2015 Marche regional election Ceriscioli has been a candidate for the Partito Democratico and was elected President of the Marche region with the 41.1% of the preferences.

References

1966 births
Living people
Presidents of Marche
People from Pesaro
Mayors of Pesaro
Democratic Party (Italy) politicians
Democrats of the Left politicians
Democratic Party of the Left politicians